This article lists political parties in Nicaragua.

Political culture 
Historically, Nicaragua had a two-party system, with varying two dominant political parties. The 2006 general election could have marked the end of the bipartite scheme, as the anti-Sandinista forces split into two major political alliances: the Nicaraguan Liberal Alliance (ALN) and the Constitutionalist Liberal Party (PLC).

Parties

Major parties
Three parties and alliances currently hold seats in the National Assembly:

Other parties
Alternative for Change (AC) a
Sandinista Renovation Movement (MRS) a
Central American Unionist Party (PUCA) a
Communist Party of Nicaragua (PCdeN) a
Christian Democratic Union (UDC) a
Christian Unity Movement (MUC) a
Ecologist Green Party of Nicaragua (PVEN) a
Great Liberal Union (GUL)
Marxist-Leninist Popular Action Movement (MAP-ML) a
New Liberal Party (PALI) a
Nicaraguan Resistance Party (PRN) a
Nicaraguan Socialist Party (PSN) a
Party for Citizen Action (PAC) a
Popular Conservative Alliance (APC) a

a = active

Defunct parties or parties with no legal status

Christian Alternative Party (AC)
Conservative Action Movement (MAC)
Conservative Alliance (ALCON) a
Democratic Conservative Party (PCD)
Democratic Party of National Confidence (PDCN)
Independent Liberal Party for National Unity (PLIUN) a
Liberal Salvation Movement (MSL)
National Action Party (PAN)
National Conservative Action (ANC)
National Conservative Unity Party (PUNC)
National Convergence
National Democratic Party (PND)
National Project (PRONAL)
National Unity Movement (MUN) a
Nicaraguan Democratic Movement (MDN) a
Popular Social Christian Party (PPSC)
Revolutionary Unity Movement (MUR)
Revolutionary Workers' Party (PRT)
Social Christian Party (PSC) a
Social Conservative Party (PSC)
Social Democratic Party (PSD) a
Unity Alliance (AU)
UNO-96 Alliance (UNO-96)
Up with the Republic a

a = active

Regional Parties

Authentic Costeño Autonomy Movement (MAAC)
Coast Alliance (Alianza Costeña)
Coast People’s Party (PPC)
Costeño Democratic Alliance (ADECO)
Multiethnic Indigenist Party (PIM)
Multiethnic Party for Coast Unity (PAMUC) a

a = active

Historical

National Opposition Union (UNO)
1966 National Opposition Union (UNO)
Democratic Party (Partido Democrático, PD)
Legitimist Party (Partido Legitimista, PL)
Republican Party (Partido Republicano, PR)
Nationalist Liberal Party (Partido Liberal Nacionalista, PLN)
Traditional Conservative Party (Partido Conservador Tradicionalista, PCT)

Popular subscription associations

Civic Association of Potosí (ACP)
Sol Association (Asociación Sol)
Viva Managua Movement (Movimiento Viva Managua)

See also
 Politics of Nicaragua

References 

Nicaragua
Politics of Nicaragua
 
Political parties
Nicaragua
Political parties